Tamás Kecskés (born 15 January 1986) is a Hungarian football player who plays for Siófok.

Career statistics

Club

External links 
HLSZ 

1986 births
Living people
Hungarian footballers
People from Szentes
Association football midfielders
MTK Budapest FC players
BFC Siófok players
Pécsi MFC players
Paksi FC players
Nemzeti Bajnokság I players
Nemzeti Bajnokság II players
Sportspeople from Csongrád-Csanád County